Richard Logan may refer to:

Richard Logan (cricketer) (born 1980), English cricketer
Richard Logan (footballer, born 1969), English footballer, clubs included Huddersfield Town
Richard Logan (footballer, born 1982), English footballer, clubs included Ipswich Town
Richard Logan (footballer, born 1988), English footballer, plays for Consett

See also
 Dick Logan (disambiguation)